This is a list of currently elected Sinn Féin representatives.

Members of Dáil Éireann
Sinn Féin has 36 TDs in the Dáil Éireann (lower house) (most recent election in 2020):
Mary Lou McDonald, TD for Dublin Central
Denise Mitchell, TD for Dublin Bay North
Chris Andrews, TD for Dublin Bay South
Louise O'Reilly, TD for Dublin Fingal
Eoin Ó Broin, TD for Dublin Mid-West
Mark Ward, TD for Dublin Mid-West
Dessie Ellis, TD for Dublin North-West
Paul Donnelly, TD for Dublin West
Aengus Ó Snodaigh, TD for Dublin South-Central
Seán Crowe, TD for Dublin South-West
Kathleen Funchion, TD for Carlow-Kilkenny
Matt Carthy, TD for Cavan–Monaghan
Pauline Tully, TD for Cavan–Monaghan
Pat Buckley, TD for Cork East
Thomas Gould, TD for Cork North-Central
Donnchadh Ó Laoghaire, TD for Cork South-Central
Pádraig Mac Lochlainn, TD for Donegal
Pearse Doherty, TD for Donegal
Mairéad Farrell, TD for Galway West
Réada Cronin, TD for Kildare North
Patricia Ryan, TD for Kildare South
Pa Daly, TD for Kerry
Brian Stanley, TD for Laois–Offaly
Maurice Quinlivan, TD for Limerick City
Sorca Clarke, TD for Longford–Westmeath
Imelda Munster, TD for Louth
Ruairí Ó Murchú, TD for Louth
Rose Conway-Walsh, TD for Mayo
Darren O'Rourke, TD for Meath East
Johnny Guirke, TD for Meath West
Claire Kerrane, TD for Roscommon–Galway
Martin Kenny, TD for Sligo-Leitrim
Martin Browne, TD for Tipperary
David Cullinane, TD for Waterford
Johnny Mythen, TD for Wexford
John Brady, TD for Wicklow

Members of Seanad Éireann
Sinn Féin has four senators in the Seanad Éireann (upper house) (most recent election in 2020). Originally, there were five but Elisha McCallion resigned in October 2020.
Lynn Boylan, Agricultural Panel
Paul Gavan, Labour Panel
Niall Ó Donnghaile, Administrative Panel
Fintan Warfield, Cultural and Educational Panel

Members of the Northern Ireland Assembly
Sinn Féin have 27 MLAs in the Northern Ireland Assembly (most recent election in 2017):

 Carál Ní Chuilín, MLA for Belfast North
 Gerry Kelly, MLA for Belfast North
 Deirdre Hargey, MLA for Belfast South
 Órlaithí Flynn, MLA for Belfast West
 Danny Baker, MLA for Belfast West
 Pat Sheehan, MLA for Belfast West
 Aisling Reilly, MLA for Belfast West
 Caoimhe Archibald, MLA for East Londonderry
 Jemma Dolan, MLA for Fermanagh and South Tyrone
 Colm Gildernew, MLA for Fermanagh and South Tyrone
 Áine Murphy, MLA for Fermanagh and South Tyrone
 Ciara Ferguson , MLA for Foyle
 Pádraig Delargy, MLA for Foyle
 Emma Sheerin, MLA for Mid Ulster
 Michelle O'Neill, MLA for Mid Ulster
 Linda Dillon, MLA for Mid Ulster
 Cathal Boylan, MLA for Newry and Armagh
 Conor Murphy, MLA for Newry and Armagh
 Liz Kimmins, MLA for Newry and Armagh
 Philip McGuigan, MLA for North Antrim
 Declan Kearney, MLA for South Antrim
 Sinéad Ennis, MLA for South Down
 Cathy Mason, MLA for South Down
 John O'Dowd, MLA for Upper Bann
 Maoliosa McHugh, MLA for West Tyrone
 Declan McAleer, MLA for West Tyrone
 Nicola Brogan, MLA for West Tyrone

Members of the United Kingdom Parliament
Sinn Féin has seven MPs (most recent election in 2019):
 Michelle Gildernew, MP for Fermanagh and South Tyrone
 Órfhlaith Begley, MP for West Tyrone 
 Francie Molloy, MP for Mid Ulster
 Mickey Brady, MP for Newry and Armagh
 Paul Maskey, MP for Belfast West
 Chris Hazzard, MP for South Down
 John Finucane, MP for Belfast North

All Sinn Féin MPs follow an abstentionist policy with regard to Westminster, meaning they do not take their seats in that parliament.

Members of the European Parliament
Sinn Féin has one MEP (most recent election in 2019):
Chris MacManus, MEP for Midlands–North-West (European Parliament constituency)

References

Sinn Féin representatives

External links
Sinn Féin
Sinn Féin Original website.

 
Lists of United Kingdom MPs by party
Lists of Irish politicians
Sinn Fein